La Tuque may refer to:

Canada:
 La Tuque, Quebec
 La Tuque (census division)
 La Tuque (urban agglomeration)

 La Tuque Airport (IATA airport code: YLQ; ICAO airport code: CYLQ)
 La Tuque Water Aerodrome (TC airport code: CTH6)
 La Tuque railway station
 La Tuque generating station, a hydroelectric power plant on the Saint-Maurice River
 , a Canadian WWII Prestonian-class frigate

 La Tuque Wolves

See also 

 El Tuque, a tourist complex in Puerto Rico
 Tuque, a knit cap
 
 
 
 Tuque (disambiguation)
 Touques (disambiguation)
 Toque (disambiguation)